Marion Wagner (born 1 February 1978, in Mainz) is a retired German sprinter who specialized in the 100 metres. Her personal best time is 11.24 seconds, which was achieved in July 2009 at the German Championships in Ulm. She represents the sports club USC Mainz.

Wagner represented Germany at the 2008 Summer Olympics in Beijing. She competed in the 4 × 100 metres relay together with Anne Möllinger, Cathleen Tschirch and Verena Sailer. In their first round heat they placed third behind Jamaica and Russia and in front of China. Their time of 43.59 seconds was the eighth time overall out of sixteen participating nations. With this result they qualified for the final in which they sprinted to a time of 43.28 seconds, which was the fifth place.  She was an unused reserve for the German 4 × 100 m team at the 2012 Summer Olympics.

Achievements

References

External links
 
 

1978 births
Living people
German female sprinters
Athletes (track and field) at the 2000 Summer Olympics
Athletes (track and field) at the 2004 Summer Olympics
Athletes (track and field) at the 2008 Summer Olympics
Olympic athletes of Germany
World Athletics Championships medalists
European Athletics Championships medalists
World Athletics Championships winners
Olympic female sprinters
Sportspeople from Mainz